Magic Hour or The Magic Hour may refer to:

Film and television
The Magic Hour (2008 film), a Japanese film directed by Kōki Mitani
Magic Hour (2011 film), a Greek film directed by Costas Kapakas
The Magic Hour (talk show), an American talk show hosted by Magic Johnson

Episodes
"The Magic Hour" (Brandy & Mr. Whiskers)
"Magic Hour" (Charmed)
"Magic Hour" (Haven)
"Magic Hour" (Home Before Dark)

Music
Magic Hour (band), an American psychedelic rock band

Albums
Magic Hour (Cast album) or the title song (see below), 1999
Magic Hour (Scissor Sisters album), 2012
The Magic Hour (album) or the title song, by Wynton Marsalis, 2004
The Magic Hour, an album by Steve Allee, 1995

Songs
"Magic Hour" (song), by Cast, 1999
"Magic Hour", a song by Jhené Aiko from Chilombo, 2020
"The Magic Hour", a song by Kimbra from The Golden Echo, 2014

Other
Golden hour (photography), time of day with particular sunlight conditions